The Leckhampton Players is an amateur dramatics company based in Leckhampton, near Cheltenham.   Founded in 1947, it performs regularly at Leckhampton Village Hall.  Productions typically include a pantomime in January/February each year, a musical show in May/June, and a play (most often comedy/farce) in October. The Players celebrated its fiftieth anniversary in 1997.

The Players won the Gloucestershire Drama Association award for Best Pantomime in 2000, 2001 and 2006.

Historical Productions

 1970   Puss in Boots
 Productions since 1975

Recent Productions

2011 Old Time Music Hall
2011 Mother Goose
2010 S(w)inging the 60's
2010 Dry Rot
2010 Dick Whittington
2009 Hello & Goodbye
2009 Viva Mexico
2009 Raise the Roof (charity fundraising concert)
2009 The Wizard of Oz
2008 Kindly Keep It Covered
2008 From Stage to Screen
2008 Ali Baba and the Forty Thieves
2007 Murder in Play
2007 Murder at the Music Hall
2007 Frankenstein - The Panto
2006 Inspector Drake and the Perfekt Crime
2006 Wild Wild Women
2006 Cinderella

References

External links 
 Leckhampton Players

Theatre companies in the United Kingdom
Leckhampton